Bokenham is a surname. Notable people with the surname include:

 William Bokenham (died 1702), British naval officer and member of parliament for Rochester
 Osbern Bokenham ( 1393– 1463), English author and friar